The women's team competition of the racquetball events at the 2015 Pan American Games was held from July 24–26 at the Direct Energy Centre (Exhibition Centre), in Toronto, Canada. Mexico is the defending Pan American Games Women's Team champion.

Schedule
All times are Central Standard Time (UTC-6).

Results

Playoffs

Final standings

References

Racquetball at the 2015 Pan American Games
Racquetball at multi-sport events